"Hesitate" is the third single from Stone Sour's third album Audio Secrecy. The one-track promo single for the song, released strictly to radio in 2010. The CD comes in a thin paper sleeve with no artwork.

Background
"Hesitate" is a power ballad, in the same vein as "Bother" and "Through Glass". Taylor's voice flies over a steadily building mid-tempo track that blends electric and acoustic guitars over a spare rhythm section.

When the full band joins Taylor's vocals, the song stays much more restrained than a typical power ballad, which allows for greater focus on the heartbreak described in the lyrics:

"Because I see you / But I can't feel you anymore / So go away / I need you but I can't need you anymore / You hesitate / Hesitate."

Music video
The music video for the song "Hesitate" off the band's third full-length Audio Secrecy. Frontman Corey Taylor offers the following explanation behind the concept of the song:

Reception
Rock Sound said the song was "a truly heartfelt lamentation via tender lyrics that display Taylor's more fragile side yet, although it's one of the album's most touching tracks, it's also one of the biggest sounding, recalling the power ballads of the late 80s."

Track listing

Chart positions

References

Stone Sour songs
2010 songs
Roadrunner Records singles
Songs written by Corey Taylor
Songs written by Shawn Economaki
Songs written by Roy Mayorga
Songs written by Josh Rand
Songs written by Jim Root
Song recordings produced by Nick Raskulinecz